Amerila magnifica is a moth of the subfamily Arctiinae first described by Walter Rothschild in 1910. It is found in Kenya, Mozambique and South Africa.

References

Moths described in 1910
Amerilini
Moths of Africa
Lepidoptera of Mozambique
Lepidoptera of Kenya
Lepidoptera of South Africa